The 2018 FINA Marathon Swim World Series, also known as the FINA/HOSA Marathon Swim World Series for sponsorship reasons, took place from 17 March to 9 November 2018. It was the 12th edition of the FINA-sanctioned series, and included eight events.

Calendar

The calendar for the 2018 series, announced by FINA.

Medal summary

Men

Women

Medal table

Results

The top ten finishers in each event.

Doha

Men

Women

Seychelles

Men

Women

Setúbal

Men

Women

Balatonfüred

Men

Women

References

External links

 Official website

FINA Marathon Swim World Series
FINA Marathon Swim World Series